Italy competed at the 1975 Summer Universiade in Rome, Italy and won 7 medals in the only sport disputed in that edition of the Summer Universiade, the Athletics.

Medals

Details

References

External links
 Universiade (World University Games)
 WORLD STUDENT GAMES (UNIVERSIADE - MEN)
 WORLD STUDENT GAMES (UNIVERSIADE - WOMEN)

1975
1975 in Italian sport
Italy